Scarlett is a 1991 novel by Alexandra Ripley, written as a sequel to Margaret Mitchell's 1936 novel, Gone with the Wind. The book debuted on The New York Times Best Seller list.

It was adapted as a television mini-series of the same title in 1994 starring Timothy Dalton as Rhett Butler and Joanne Whalley-Kilmer as Scarlett O'Hara.

Plot summary
The book begins where Gone with the Wind left off, with Scarlett attending the funeral of her former sister-in-law and rival for Ashley Wilkes' affection, Melanie Wilkes, at which her estranged husband, Rhett Butler, is not present. Scarlett, heartbroken and aggravated that Rhett left her, sets out for Tara and is saddened when she learns that Mammy, her mainstay since birth, is dying. She sends a telegram to notify Rhett about Mammy under the name of Will Benteen (her sister Suellen's husband), because she knows that Rhett won't come if he suspects Scarlett is there. Before Mammy dies, she makes Rhett swear to look after Scarlett. Rhett agrees, although he has no intention of honoring the request. After Mammy's death, Rhett and Scarlett fight, which culminates in Rhett leaving and Scarlett returning to the Atlanta house, determined to win Rhett back.

Scarlett travels to Charleston to visit Rhett's family and tries to corner him by winning his mother's affection. She convinces Rhett to take her for a sail on the harbor, where their boat capsizes during a terrible storm. Scarlett and Rhett swim to an island, where they make love in a cave. Rhett initially denies, then admits, that he loves Scarlett, but he does not want to "lose himself" over her again. Back in Charleston, Rhett leaves Scarlett near death at his mother's house, telling her, in a letter, that while he admires her bravery, he will never see her again.

After Scarlett regains her strength, she leaves Charleston with her two aunts,  Pauline and Eulalie, to attend her maternal grandfather's birthday celebration in Savannah. She leaves a note to Rhett's mother with Rhett's sister, Rosemary, who burns the note.

Scarlett connects with the Savannah O'Haras against her maternal family's wishes. Scarlett's grandfather offers Scarlett his inheritance if she remains with him in Savannah until his death and avoids contact with her father's side of the family. Scarlett refuses and storms out of the house. She goes to stay with her cousin Jamie and his family. Soon another cousin named Colum, a priest from Ireland, joins them. Scarlett agrees to travel to Ireland with him.  By this time Scarlett has realized that she is pregnant with Rhett's child but she keeps her pregnancy hidden.

In Ireland, Scarlett is heartily welcomed by her Irish kin. Exploring  with Colum, they pass an old house called 'Ballyhara'; it was O'Hara land long ago before the English seized it. Scarlett soon receives a notification of divorce from Rhett. She makes plans to leave for America but learns that Rhett is now married to Anne Hampton, who is said to resemble Melanie Wilkes. Heartbroken, Scarlett decides to remain in Ireland. She works with lawyers and leaves her two-third share of her father's plantation, Tara, to her son Wade Hampton (fathered by her first husband, Charles Hamilton, brother of Melanie Wilkes), buys Ballyhara and settles down in Ireland, to her Irish family's delight.  She and Colum tell everyone that her husband died rather than tell the truth that she was divorced.

As Ballyhara is restored, Scarlett eagerly awaits the birth of her child, praying for it to be a girl and vowing to be a good mother. She is well respected by the townspeople and her family, earning her a reputation as a hard worker.  She becomes known as The O'Hara, a title reserved for the undisputed leader of a family clan.

On Halloween night, her water breaks. Her housekeeper, Mrs. Fitzpatrick, and the midwife whom Colum summons are unable to handle the situation, and it appears that Scarlett will die. Instead, she is saved by a wise old woman who lives near the haunted tower.  The caesarean birth is successful, but internal damage is done to Scarlett, who can no longer have children.  The baby, a girl, is born with dark skin like Rhett's, but with blue eyes that slowly turn green. Scarlett names her Katie Colum O'Hara, and calls her "Cat" because of her green eyes.

Ashley Wilkes—her past lover, whom she wished to marry during her youth—proposes to Scarlett. She is grateful but kindly declines, telling him that she is not interested in marrying him. Instead, Scarlett and Ashley decide to remain friends.

After Scarlett has settled down in Ballyhara, she runs into Rhett a number of times—in America while she is on the boat to Boston, at a fair where she admits she still loves him, and at a foxhunt a week later. He still does not know he has a child. He then seeks her out at a society ball and Scarlett realizes he still loves her.

Lord Fenton, one of the wealthiest men in Europe, pursues Scarlett, wanting to marry her. He wants Scarlett to bear his children after seeing Cat's fiery spirit and fearlessness. He also plans to unite their estates; he owns Adamstown, the land adjacent to Scarlett's. Angered by his arrogance, Scarlett refuses and orders him out of her house. Scarlett leaves for Dublin for her yearly visit for parties and hunts. She later decides to accept Lord Fenton when she hears that Anne is pregnant with Rhett’s child.

The news leaks out about her engagement and a drunken Rhett insults her when she runs into him at a horse race. A friend tells Scarlett that Anne and the baby both died, and she rushes back to Ballyhara hopeful that Rhett will come looking for her. She finds English there with a warrant to arrest Colum, who is the head of a group of Irish terrorists. Colum is murdered and Rosaleen Fitzpatrick sets fire to the English arsenal to avenge him. The villagers, thinking Scarlett is in league with the English, burn her house down. Rhett comes to her rescue and  tries to convince her to escape with him, but Scarlett runs around her house yelling for her daughter. When she tells Rhett that he is Cat's father, he helps her search. After finding Cat, the three climb into a high tower on Ballyhara and stay there for the night. Rhett and Scarlett both say "I love you". They wake up the next morning ready to leave Ireland and start their new lives together.

Reception 
Reviewing the novel for The New York Times in 1991, Janet Maslin said the book was a "stunningly uneventful 823-page holding action." Donald McCaig, author of Rhett Butler's People, said it was his impression that the Margaret Mitchell estate was "thoroughly embarrassed" by Scarlett. Scarlett, universally panned by critics, nevertheless was a commercial success. The book sold millions of copies and remains in print.

When discussing the possibility of his own works receiving authorized sequels after his death, A Song of Ice and Fire author George R. R. Martin called such books "abominations, to my mind, like [...] Scarlett, the [...] Gone With the Wind sequel".

TV adaptation

It was adapted as a television mini-series of the same title in 1994 starring Timothy Dalton as Rhett Butler and Joanne Whalley-Kilmer as Scarlett O'Hara.  The plot of the mini-series varies considerably from the book.

References

1991 American novels
Sequel novels
Novels set during the American Civil War
Works based on Gone with the Wind
Novels set in Atlanta
Novels set in Ireland
American novels adapted into television shows